The Teaching Company, doing business as Wondrium, is a media production company that produces educational, video and audio content in the form of courses, documentaries, series under two content brands - Wondrium and The Great Courses. The company distributes their content globally through a mix of Direct to Consumer models such as their streaming service Wondrium.com and TheGreatCourses.com, as well distribution through third party platforms like Audible, Amazon and Roku.

Wondrium, founded by Tom Rollins in 1990, is currently owned by Brentwood Associates PE and is headquartered in Chantilly, Virginia.

History 
In 1990, the company was founded by Thomas M. Rollins, former Chief Counsel of the United States Senate Committee on Labor and Human Resources. Rollins had been inspired by a 10-hour videotaped lecture series by Irving Younger he watched to prepare for an exam while at Harvard Law School. He never forgot the series and wanted to share the experience with others. He began recruiting professors and experts to record lectures, with the first courses covering psychology, political theory, and Shakespeare.

By 2000, the company was well established, with about $20 million (USD) in annual revenue.

In October 2006, the company was acquired by Brentwood Associates, a private equity investment firm. The company’s catalog grew from 20 million to almost 70 million and digitized 6,000 hours of content. Sales increased more than 35% the first year and then continued to grow at a double-digit pace. In 2013, indirect distribution channels, including Audible.com, Amazon Instant Video, Comcast Video on Demand, and Netflix were added.

In 2015, the company introduced its online subscription service, The Great Courses Plus, which gave lifelong learners streaming access to the majority of The Great Courses content library through a web browser or iOS, Android, Roku, Apple TV, or Fire TV app.

In 2016, the firm was earning $150 million annually in revenue.

In April 2021, the company announced the rebranding of its global streaming platform from the Great Courses Plus to Wondrium. Along with the rebranding, the company announced 1,000 hours of new content from licensing agreements with Kino Lorber, MagellanTV, and Craftsy.

As of 2021, content included over 7,500 hours of content in the format of documentary and independent films, docuseries, short-form series, featurettes, courses, and tutorials. There are over 1,200 titles with more than 26,000 lectures.

Content
Wondrium produces video and audio content under its two brands: Wondrium and The Great Courses. Both brands focus on educational content with the promise of learning outcomes. The Wondrium line of content, while also educational focused, focuses on learning experiences outside of the influence of traditional University curriculum and takes other content forms outside of courses such as documentaries, docuseries, and travelogues. Courses are developed by the experts and the Wondrium production team. Many of the programs’ episodes are around thirty minutes.

The production quality of the courses is "a cut above" free courses offered on YouTube, according to a report in The New York Times. Chief executive Paul Suijk described the company as the "Netflix of learning."

Content covers different subjects and categories such as science, math, economics, literature, language, history, religion, philosophy, fine arts, music, better living, health, wellness, how-to courses, personal enrichment, hobbies and leisure, and travel. The company has partnerships with the Culinary Institute of America, the Smithsonian Institution, the Mayo Clinic, National Geographic, Penguin Random House, Scientific American, and others. Self-described fans include Bill Gates and George Lucas, who delivered taped opening remarks to a Great Courses conference in 2015.

As of December 2019, the company lists the following categories and numbers of courses:

 Better Living (187)
 Economics & Finance (27)
 Fine Arts (31)
 High School (39)
 History (229)
 Literature & Language (109)
 Mathematics (48)
 Music (36)
 Philosophy & Intellectual History (120)
 Professional (75)
 Religion (83)
 Science (191)

Professors & experts 
Most programs are delivered by an expert in the respective field. The lectures often involve computer graphics and animations; some offer an optional PDF guidebook to serve as a custom-made textbook for the course.

The following experts and university professors, among others, have authored courses.

 Gregory S. Aldrete
 Patrick Allitt
 Stephen Alvarez
 Dorsey Armstrong
 Kenneth R. Bartlett
 Arthur T. Benjamin
 Jonah Berger
 Ira Block
 Bob Brier
 Edward B. Burger
 Sean M. Carroll
 Phillip Cary
 Thomas Childers
 David Christian
 Eric H. Cline
 Jodi Cobb
 William R. Cook
 Anne Curzan
 Philip Daileader
 Dennis Dalton
 Leo Damrosch
 Daniel Drezner
 William Dunham
 Malcolm David Eckel
 Sylvia Earle
 Bart D. Ehrman
 John Esposito
 Brian M. Fagan
 J. Rufus Fears
 Alexei Filippenko
 Jane Friedman
 Sylvester James Gates
 Eamonn Gearon
 Steven L. Goldman
 Anthony A. Goodman
 Robert Greenberg
 Annie Griffiths
 Patrick Grim
 Allen C. Guelzo
 Richard J. Haier
 James Hall
 Ken Hammond
 Kenneth W. Harl
 Donald J. Harreld
 Robert Hazen
 Craig Heller
 Kathleen Higgins
 James Hynes
 Peter H. Irons
 Luke Timothy Johnson
 Ed Kashi
 Douglas Kellner
 Eileen Kennedy-Moore
 Alan Charles Kors
 Joseph Koterski
 Richard Kurin
 Edward Larson
 Mark Leary
 Seth Lerer
 Amy-Jill Levine
 Allan Lichtman
 Don Lincoln
 Jodi Magness
 Clancy Martin
 John McWhorter
 John Medina
 Michael Melford
 Andrew B. Newberg
 Ashton Nichols
 Steven Novella
 Sherwin B. Nuland
 Joseph Nye
 Robert A. Oden
 Pamela Radcliff
 Mark Ravina
 Richard Restak
 Daniel N. Robinson
 Rick Roderick
 Jeffrey Rosen
 David B. Ruderman
 Robert Sapolsky
 Joel Sartore
 Benjamin Schumacher
 John Searle
 Jeremy Shearmur
 Michael Shermer
 Tom Shippey
 Seth Shostak
 Ronald K. Siegel
 Jeremy Silman
 Jennifer Simonetti-Bryan
 Robert C. Solomon
 Richard B. Spence
 Michael Starbird
 Jonathan Steinberg
 David R. Stone
 Steven Strogatz
 Michael Sugrue
 James Tanton
 Timothy Taylor
 David Thorburn
 Neil deGrasse Tyson
 Elizabeth Vandiver
 Indre Viskontas
 Irwin Weil
 Arnold Weinstein
 Eric R. Williams
 Gary K. Wolfe
 Richard Wolfson
 Molly Worthen
 Michael E. Wysession
 Michael Yamashita
 David Zarefsky
In 2022, Wondrium ordered three seasons of a new speaker series called “Wondrium Insights.” Its speakers included:

 Sugar Ray Leonard
 Diana Nyad
 Mary Lambert

Audio-only titles available through Audible 
While many Wondrium titles are available through Audible under The Great Courses brand, the company also produces a line of audio only titles exclusively for the Audible Originals brand. As of 2022 the company has produced over 75 of those titles including:

 The Life and Times of Beethoven
 Falling in Love with Romance Movies
 Raising Curious Kids

Distribution
Wondrium distributes and monetizes their content through a number of ways, including direct to consumer models and through partnership with third party distributors.

Wondrium 
Wondrium is the company's direct to consumer subscription streaming service that offers most of what Wondrium and The Great Courses produces as well as additional licensed non-fiction content from select partners. This streaming service is distributed globally. In 2021, it offered about 7,500 hours of content with three pricing options: a monthly plan, a quarterly plan, and an annual plan. It is available on mobile, web, and platforms such as Apple TV, Roku, Amazon Fire TV, iOS, and Android. Wondrium offers both video streaming and audio streaming.

The Great Courses Signature Collection 
The Great Courses Signature Collection is the second streaming subscription service offered by the company that is distributed by third parties, including Comcast, Roku Channels, Amazon Channels, YouTube, and Apple TV and focuses specifically on The Great Courses line of content. It contains a limited portion of the total count Wondrium and The Great Courses produces and releases relative to the Wondrium streaming service. This collection consists of more than 300 courses on subjects such as philosophy, ancient and modern history, photography, professional development, science and cooking.

Audible 
In 2013, courses were made available through Audible under The Great Courses brand. In 2019, the two companies announced their plan to create new audio-only nonfiction titles. The first three titles were Conspiracies and Conspiracy Theories: What We Should Believe - and Why, Medieval Myths and Mysteries, and No Calculator? No Problem!: Mastering Mental Math.

Great Courses (TheGreatCourses.com) 
These titles are available to purchase digitally, audio or video, or through DVD. Customers can choose from over 1,200 titles in subject categories including the arts, science, literature, self-improvement, history, music, philosophy, theology, economics, mathematics, business, professional advancement, photography, and cooking.

Reaction
American conservative analysts described the social science courses offered by The Teaching Company as more suitable to general audiences than what is offered at traditional American liberal arts colleges. Noting that the company's audience is not similar to current U.S. college admissions, the indicated result was that the catalog has had less emphasis on issues such as sexism and racism, more common to historical lenses used after the 1960s, to prioritise content that describes "everything the civilization has figured out so far and to discover new things". The conservative analysts further note that the survey format of instruction predominates, with few in-depth courses on Western-specific thinkers or philosophical schools, and more emphasis on covering the fundamentals of a subject, as if it were an introductory college course.

References

Bibliography

External links
Wondrium
The Great Courses

Alternative education
Companies based in Fairfax County, Virginia
High school course levels
Education companies established in 1990
1990 establishments in Virginia
Adult education in the United States
Subscription video streaming services
2006 mergers and acquisitions